Medeu District is an administrative subdivision of the city of Almaty. It is considered one of the "elite" districts of the city.

History 
The first borders of the city of Almaty (then Verniy) passed within the Medeu District. The district was originally established on 14 September 1936 as Frunze District.

On 12 December 1995, by the decision of the 1st Convocation of the Almaty City Mäslihat and the akim of the city, Frunze District was renamed into Medeu District. The name comes from the tract, which is located on the territory of the district which was assigned to the tract in 1920 with the light hand of the commissar and writer Dmitry Furmanov. It was he who gave the order to open the first recreation area in the tract. There is an assumption that Furmanov had in mind the houses of the city dweller Medeu Pusurmanov, which were located in the tract.

References 

 

Districts of Kazakhstan

Districts of Almaty